John Cromwell may refer to:

John Cromwell (director) (1887–1979), American film director and producer; grandfather of the actor by the same name
John P. Cromwell (1901–1943), American naval officer
John Wesley Cromwell (1846–1927), editor, journalist and civil rights activist in Washington, DC
John Cromwell (actor), American actor, grandson of the director and son of actor James Cromwell